Rentboy.com was a commercial social networking site which connected male sex workers and masseurs with potential clients. Rentboy.com is also the major organizer of the International Escort Awards and a traveling cabaret called "Hustlaball."

Formerly, Rentboy.com published a manifesto on their website intended for sex workers and clients. This statement promoted a philosophy of "safer sex because the vast majority of sex-workers will not engage in unsafe sex", and says, "while this job may not be for everyone, it has its rightful place among honorable careers." On August 25, 2015, CEO Jeffrey Hurant and six others were arrested at Rentboy.com headquarters.

Company profile
Jeffrey Hurant founded Rentboy.com in 1997, making it the first male escorting website, and today it is still the largest website with this focus.  Since then, Davids has acted as CEO with Sean Van Sant as company director. The company is based in Manhattan. Van Sant describes Rentboy.com as follows:

Rentboy.com is not an escort agency.  We are an ad listing service for male escorts, where men place their own ads and work for themselves, so that clients can contact them directly. Our mission is to create a non-judgmental space where anyone curious about exploring male-male companionship can hire a man by the hour.

, rentboy.com employed 10 people in three offices and hosted 40,000 escort profiles. In 2009, 1.4 million unique clients visited the website.

On August 25, 2015, Federal agents from the Department of Homeland Security and members of the New York Police Department raided Rentboy.com's headquarters.

Sponsorships
Rentboy.com has sponsored its own float every year since 1998 in the New York City Gay Pride March.

International Escort Awards
The International Escort Awards, also known as the "Hookies", were founded by rentboy.com's Jeff Davids and Sean Van Sant. The first ceremony was held at the Roxy in New York City in October 2006.

Hustlaball
Hustlaball is a sex cabaret and dance party organized in part by rentboy.com as a party to destigmatize and honor sex workers. Since 2007, Rentboy.com has hosted Hustlaball three times yearly with a Las Vegas show in January, a London show in May, and a Berlin show in October. Part of the proceeds from this event go to charities such as the Lambeth Hate Crime Initiative, the Terrence Higgins Trust, and the Gay Men's Health Crisis.

History
Founder Davids said of Hustlaball, "This is a chance for sex workers to be open and proud of what they do."

Federal and state investigation
On August 25, 2015, DHS and NYPD agents raided the Manhattan headquarters of Rentboy.com as part of a money laundering and state prostitution investigation. Seven people, including CEO Jeffrey Davids, were arrested. "As alleged, Rentboy.com attempted to present a veneer of legality, when in fact this Internet brothel made millions of dollars from the promotion of illegal prostitution," acting U.S. Attorney for the Eastern District of New York Kelly Currie said in a statement. DHS was involved in the raid in part because the investigation involved transferring money across state lines. The seven defendants are charged with conspiring to violate the Travel Act by promoting prostitution.

On October 7, 2016, Hurant pleaded guilty in federal court of promoting prostitution. In August 2017 Hurant was sentenced to 6 months in federal prison. While the case had prompted allegations of anti-gay bias, U.S. Immigration and Customs Enforcement stated that "any insinuation that a specific population was targeted is categorically false."

See also
 George Alan Rekers

References

External links
 rentboy.com

Internet properties established in 1996
Male prostitution
Sex worker organizations in the United States
American social networking websites